The 1904 VFL season was the eighth season of the Victorian Football League (VFL). Ninety eight players made their senior debut in the 1899 season, while another 18 players debuted for a new club having previously played in the VFL.

Summary

Debuts

References

Australian rules football records and statistics
Australian rules football-related lists
1904 in Australian rules football